Kochhar or Kochar is a surname that is found among the Khatri community of India.

Before 1947, Kochhars were located in the districts of Gujrat and Rawalpindi in Punjab. According to historian R.C. Dogra, Kochhar comes from the word "Kavach" meaning armour. Among the Khatris, it is part of the Bunjahi sub-caste which consists of clans such as Duggal, Handa, Johar, Puri, Nanda, Thapar, Vij, Wahi and 44 other clans.

The Kochhar clan has produced Dewan Mokham Chand, described as one of the most important generals of Maharaja Ranjit Singh of Sikh Empire who was responsible for defeating the Durrani Empire.

Notable people 

 Atul Kochhar, Indian chef who is the first person to receive a Michelin Star
 Ajay Kochhar, is a Rear Admiral serving Flag officer in the Indian Navy.
 Archana Kochhar, among the top 5 fashion designer of India
 Chanda Kochhar, MD and CEO of ICICI Bank
 Samir Kochhar, Indian actor in Sacred Games
 Saadiya Kochhar, Indian traveler
 Tahira Kochhar, Indian actress

References

Caste system in India
Surnames
Indian surnames
Surnames of Indian origin
Punjabi-language surnames
Hindu surnames
Khatri clans
Khatri surnames